is a Japanese visual kei rock band formed in 2015 signed to Pony Canyon. They made their debut single "Black Swallowtail" as the second opening for the anime television series Rokka: Braves of the Six Flowers, and also their debut mini album Another Ark.

Members
  – Composer (Asriel (band))
  – Vocals
  – Guitar
  – Bass
  – Drums (ex-Plastic Tree)

Discography

Mini albums
 Another Ark  (2015)
 Zodiac  (2016)

Singles
 "Black Swallowtail"  (2015)

References

External links
 

Japanese rock music groups
Pony Canyon artists
Visual kei musical groups
Musical groups established in 2015
2015 establishments in Japan